Lady Feodora Georgina Maud Gleichen (20 December 1861 London – 22 February 1922 London) was a British sculptor of figures and portrait busts and designer of decorative objects.

Background
Born Countess Feodora Georgina Maud von Gleichen, she was the eldest daughter of Prince Victor of Hohenlohe-Langenburg (a British naval officer and sculptor, and half-nephew of Queen Victoria) and his morganatic wife, Laura Seymour, a daughter of Admiral Sir George Seymour, a remote nephew of Henry VIII's Queen Jane Seymour. Within her family she was called Feo. Her father having been largely disinherited at the time of his marriage, he initially adopted his wife's morganatic comital title. The family were taken in by the Queen and given  grace and favour accommodations at St James's Palace. Her brother, Lord Edward Gleichen, became a career military officer and author. Her sister, Lady Helena Gleichen, became a portrait painter.

On 15 December 1885, the Court Circular announced the Queen's permission for Feodora's mother to share her father's rank at the Court of St James, and henceforth they were known as TSH Prince and Princess Victor of Hohenlohe-Langenburg. But the Queen did not extend that privilege to their four children, although she confirmed use of their German style as count and countesses. In 1889 Feodora and her sisters Valda and Helena were bridesmaids to the Princess Royal Louise and the Earl of Fife. On 12 June 1913 Feodora and her sisters were granted precedence before the daughters of dukes in the peerage of England by George V.

Education
Gleichen studied art in her father's studio at St James's and later with Alphonse Legros at the Slade School of Art. While maintaining her father's studio she associated with leading artists such as Sir George Frampton, sculptor of the statue of Peter Pan in Kensington Gardens. She completed her studies in Rome in 1891 and regularly exhibited at the Royal Academy from 1892 and at the New Dudley Gallery.

Career

After her father's death in 1891, she took over his studio inside of St James's Palace.

Gleichen was a multidisciplinary artist, creating large sculptures for public venues as well as smaller objects, portrait busts, drawings, small bronzes and bas reliefs. She produced many decorative objects such as frames, chalices and small sculptures, sometimes for the use of the royal family.  A bas-relief and hand-mirror in jade and bronze won her a bronze medal in 1900 at the Exposition Universelle in Paris. She also helped with illustrations for the Younghusband Expedition to Tibet in 1904.

Major works

Statue of Queen Victoria surrounded by children, Royal Victoria Hospital, Montreal, Quebec, Canada, 1895.
1906 bronze statue of Diana, Rotten Row, Hyde Park, United Kingdom.
Relief, Art Gallery of New South Wales, Sydney, Australia, 1906.
King Edward VII memorial, King Edward VII Hospital, Windsor, United Kingdom, 1912.
Statue of Florence Nightingale, Derbyshire Royal Infirmary, 1914.
37th (British) division memorial, Monchy-le-Preux, France, 1921.

Permanent collections
Her 1921 work Head of a Girl is included in the permanent collection of the Tate Gallery. A sculptural relief titled  Queen Hatasu of Egypt is included in the permanent collection of the Art Gallery of New South Wales.

Later life
During World War I she abandoned her German titles, accepting demotion by the King to the style and rank of a marquess's daughter, by Royal Warrant of Precedence, pursuant to the King's dynastic reform of titles and names during establishment of the House of Windsor in 1917.

Following an operation for appendicitis in 1922, she died at her apartment in St James's Palace. Shortly before her death, she was awarded the Légion d'honneur in 1922 and was later posthumously made the first woman member of the Royal British Society of Sculptors. The Society subsequently created an award in her name.

Ancestry

References and notes

Sources

External links 

 
 Countess Feodore Gleichen, eldest daughter of Prince and Princess Victor of Hohenlohe, 1890

1861 births
1922 deaths
20th-century British sculptors
19th-century British sculptors
20th-century English women artists
19th-century English women artists
Artists from London
Daughters of British marquesses
English women sculptors
House of Hohenlohe-Langenburg
Recipients of the Legion of Honour
English people of German descent
Sibling artists